John Alleyne or John Alleyn may refer to:

 Sir John Alleyne, 1st Baronet (1724–1801), Speaker of the House of Assembly of Barbados
 Sir John Alleyne, 3rd Baronet (1820–1912), British businessman and engineer
 John Alleyne (cricketer) (1908–1980), Australian cricketer
 John Alleyne (dancer) (b. 1960), Canadian ballet dancer and choreographer
 John Alleyne (priest) (fl. 1466–1506), Dean of St Patrick's Cathedral, Dublin
 John Alleyn (barrister) (1621–1663), English barrister and MP
 John Alleyn (mercer) (d. 1544), Lord Mayor of London
 John Alleyn (surgeon) (d. 1686) English surgeon and schoolmaster
 John Alan, Alen, or Alleyn (c. 1500–1561) English government official in Ireland

See also 
 John Aleyn (disambiguation)